Ghost Stories is a 2020 Indian Hindi-language anthology horror film, consisting of four short film segments directed by Karan Johar, Dibakar Banerjee, Zoya Akhtar and Anurag Kashyap. It is co-produced by Ronnie Screwvala and Ashi Dua under their production banner RSVP Movies and Flying Unicorn Entertainment respectively. The film features an ensemble cast including Mrunal Thakur, Avinash Tiwary, Janhvi Kapoor, Raghuvir Yadav, Sobhita Dhulipala, Vijay Varma and Pavail Gulati. It was released on Netflix on January 1, 2020.

Ghost Stories is the third of three anthology films from Johar, Banerjee, Akhtar and Kashyap, being preceded by Bombay Talkies in 2013 and Lust Stories in 2018, the latter also being released on Netflix.

Synopsis

Story 1 - directed by Zoya Akhtar 
Sameera (Janhvi Kapoor), a young nurse, arrives to take care of an ailing bedridden elderly lady, Mrs. Malik (Surekha Sikri) in a desolate house. The former is needy, clutching at a reluctant lover Guddu (Vijay Varma); the latter, a stunner in her time. The lady's son is supposed to be taking care of the old mother for the duration between the change of nurses, but he is not around. Mrs. Malik tells Sameera that her son is sleeping in the next room, but no one is there. Later, it is revealed that her son never turned up and she died of starvation three days earlier. As the camera moves away from Sameera, she stares blankly into the distance with a knowing look in her eyes. The viewers are left wondering if the ghost of Mrs Malik has inhabited Sameera's body.

Story 2 - directed by Anurag Kashyap 
Set in what feels like 90's Britain with a heavily desaturated look that borders on monochrome, the story revolves around a paranoid, pregnant woman Neha (Sobhita Dhulipala) who babysits her late sister's kid, Ansh (Zachary Braz). The obsessive affection of a kid and paranoia of a childless young woman assumes terrifying proportions. Neha at one point loses sight of what is real and what is her nightmare. A curse of the past triggers her into meltdown and another miscarriage. It is  unknown whether the child- Ansh was involved in making that happen because it seems as if he was responsible for losing the child by maybe giving her something in the water.

Story 3 - directed by Dibakar Banerjee 
A man (Sukant Goel) arrives in a small town, Bees-ghara to find it empty, except for a boy and girl. He is told that everyone has been eaten by the girl's father, who is the councilman of Sau-ghara, the big town. At first, the man refuses to believe the person, but when he tries to go out, he encounters a zombie woman who attacks him. The boy rescues him, and back in the safe house, he decides to save the children and alert the local authorities. When he gets out and enters a school, he sees the principal behaving strangely. The principal suddenly runs away. The children explain that some people, in order to save themselves from getting eaten, started eating others too as the creatures do not eat those who also eat human flesh. As the man watches, the school principal screams and convulses on the ground. The girl's father, who resembles a hairy bear-like creature enters their room. The creature, who has poor vision, is unable to detect the presence of the man and the children until the girl, overcome by love for her father, goes near him, only to be killed and eaten by him. The other two, stunned, do not move for a day, and the monster leaves. The boy has an idea that they take the blood from the girl's remains and cover their faces with it so that the zombies will believe that they too are zombies and let them go. The entire place is under surveillance by the girl's father and upon seeing the pair, he checks them personally. He grows suspicious of the boy, who in reaction, eats some of the flesh of the girl. The monster turns to the man, who holds himself, but gets scared and starts running, resulting in him being chased by the zombies. On the way, he falls into a trap. He is thrown the girl's hand, so that he can demonstrate he is one of them. The man refuses to do so, and screams as the girl's father pounces on him, only to wake up from what is supposedly a dream. The man is then confused as he wakes up in the same trap he fell into, and runs towards Bees-ghara. Finding the place deserted and burning, he assumes the worst and cries that he failed to save the children. At the same time, a car comes, full of people who resembled the earlier zombies. The man is taken by them and they tell him that they are people of Sau-ghara and that nobody lives in Bees-ghara after they burned it down because it was a very inferior place.

Story 4 - directed by Karan Johar 
Ira (Mrunal Thakur) agrees to have an arranged marriage with the handsome and wealthy Dhruv (Avinash Tiwary) who dwells in a house his grandmother built. On the first night after her wedding, she sees her husband seemingly talking to the grandmother who died 20 years ago. Each night after that, the grandmother comes to bid good night to Dhruv, who seems to be the only one who can see her.

In spite of being an adult, he enjoys playing peek-a-boo with the dead grandmother. Ira questions the maid Shanti (Heeba Shah), and learns that when Dhruv was playing peek-a-boo with her, he accidentally pushed her down the stairs. The grandmother was severely incapacitated and in terrible pain. Despite this, she would make it a point to visit Dhruv each night to wish him a good night. The conversation ends before Ira can learn the circumstances of the grandmother's passing. One night Ira gets tired of Dhruv's attachment to his dead grandmother and storms into her room, still preserved as a shrine to her, and screams at the grandmother to leave them alone. The next day, at breakfast, Shanti helps Ira stir her oatmeal. Midway through breakfast, Ira starts having severe stomach cramps and is helped to her bed by Shanti. As Ira lies writhing in pain, Shanti completes their earlier conversation, telling Ira that the grandmother had begged Shanti to put an end to her pain. Being the obedient maid that she is, she mixed castor seeds into her breakfast; thereby, poisoning her to death.

The viewer is led to understand that Shanti did the same for Ira. Ira wakes up into a brightly lit room and sees the grandmother hovering over her. Confused, Ira asks how it is that she can now see her. She lets Ira know that this is because Ira is now in her world, implying that Ira is dead. Ira then turns her head to see other human forms while the grandmother tells her that those are the others who, like Ira, did not believe in her presence. It remains unknown how they died and if Dhruv and his family had planned this all along.

Cast 

Zoya Akhtar's segment
Janhvi Kapoor as Sameera
Surekha Sikri as Mrs. Malik
Vijay Varma as Guddu

Anurag Kashyap's segment
Sobhita Dhulipala as Neha
Sagar Arya as Neha's husband
Zachary Braz as Ansh
Pavail Gulati as Ansh's father

Dibakar Banerjee's segment
Sukant Goel as Visitor
Aditya Shetty as Little Boy
Eva Ameet Pardeshi as Little Girl
Gulshan Devaiah as girl's Daddy

Karan Johar's segment
Mrunal Thakur as Irawati "Ira" Kapoor
Avinash Tiwary as Dhruv
Jyoti Subhash as Dhruv's Granny
Kitu Gidwani as Dhruv's Mother
Sumit Tandon as Dhruv's Father
Namrata Chopra as Ira's Mother
Kusha Kapila as Misha
Shataf Figar as Ira's Father
Heeba N Shah as Shanti

Production 
In April 2019, it was announced that Anurag Kashyap, Zoya Akhtar, Dibakar Banerjee, and Karan Johar will be reuniting again after Bombay Talkies and Lust Stories for a horror film for Netflix. In August, Akhtar began shooting for her segment with Vijay Varma and Janhvi Kapoor. In September, Kashyap began filming for his segment with Sobhita Dhulipala and Pavail Gulati. Mrunal Thakur and Avinash Tiwary have been cast for Johar's segment. Karan Johar found his story through a talent agency

line producer shiva Korner production manager  Arun kumar and started shooting for his segment of the anthology on 1 October 2019 in Goa.

Reception 
Saibal Chatterjee from NDTV rated the movie 2.5 stars (out of 5) with review "Let alone genuine jump scares, the film does not even eke out moments that could be deemed spine-chilling".

Swetha Ramakrishnan rated the movie 3 stars (out of 5) on Firstpost "Dibakar Banerjee's political short film elevates an otherwise bland anthology that just isn't scary".

References

External links
 
 

2020 films
Indian anthology films
Hindi-language Netflix original films
Indian direct-to-video films
Films directed by Karan Johar
Films directed by Dibakar Banerjee
Films directed by Zoya Akhtar
Films directed by Anurag Kashyap
Indian horror anthology films
2020 direct-to-video films
2020 horror films